Elizabeth Hampsten is an American historian and author. She is currently the Chester Fritz Distinguished Professor of English, emeritus, at the University of North Dakota.

Bibliography 
 Mother's Letters
 Read This Only to Yourself: The Private Writings of Midwestern Women, 1880-1910
 Settlers' Children: Growing Up on the Great Plains
 The Ballad of Johnny Sosa
 Far from Home: Families of the Westward Journey
 Day In, Day Out: Women's Lives in North Dakota

References 

American women historians
Living people
1932 births
21st-century American women